Isow's was a restaurant based at 8–10 Brewer Street, Soho, London, England. A popular misconception is that it was a kosher restaurant; it was not, but it did serve several Jewish dishes alongside its regular menu.

The restaurant was owned by Jack Isow and, when he died, it was passed on to his son, Norman; a popular venue for the entertainment industry. In 1969, Jack Isow married actress Sheree Winton. Regular celebrity patrons would have their names embossed in gold on the back of red chairs; they included Danny Kaye, Walt Disney, Frank Sinatra, Jack Solomons, Cyd Charisse, Rod Steiger, Judy Garland and Bette Davis.

The restaurant occupied the ground floor of the building. The basement housed the 'Jack Of Clubs' nightclub, named after Jack Isow.

Angelo Dundee was a regular patron of Isow's, and held a press conference with Muhammad Ali there.

Cabaret venue and nightclub Madame JoJo's now occupies the site where Isow's stood.

References

Defunct restaurants in London
Restaurants in London
Buildings and structures in the City of Westminster
History of the City of Westminster
Soho, London